Sacred stone may refer to:

Religion 
Baetyl, sacred stones in ancient Asian and European religions
Benben, in ancient Egyptian religion
Huwasi stone in Hittite religion
Omphalos, centre of the world in ancient Greece
Lapis Niger ("black stone") a shrine in the Roman Forum
Banalinga, naturally-formed ovoid stones from river-beds in India
, a phenomenon common to Semitic religions
Seonangdang in Korea

Arts & entertainment
 Sacred Stone (novel) of 2004 by Clive Cussler 
The Six Sacred Stones, novel of 2007/08
Fire Emblem: The Sacred Stones,  a tactical role-playing game
Double Dragon III: The Sacred Stones, Nintendo game, 1991
Legend of the Sacred Stone, Taiwanese puppetry feature film